Hansi is a city in the Indian state of Haryana. Hansi may also refer to:
 Hansi (Vidhan Sabha constituency)

People
 Hansi Arnstaedt (1878–1945), German actress
 Hansi Flick (born 1965), German football coach, former player and manager of the Germany national team
 Hansi Knoteck (1914–2014), actress
 Hansi Kürsch (born 1966), German lead vocalist of power metal band Blind Guardian
 Hansi Müller (born 1957), German former footballer
 Hansi Wendler (1912–2010), German actress
 "Oncle Hansi" or "Hansi", a pseudonym for Jean-Jacques Waltz, a French artist of Alsatian origin
 James Last (1929–2015), German composer and big band leader also known as "Hansi"

Other uses
 Hansi, Estonia, a village
 Hansi, the Girl who Loved the Swastika, an autobiographical book by Maria Anne Hirschmann
 Hansi, a subcaste of the Chuhra Dalit caste

See also
 Hansi hoard
 
 

Lists of people by nickname